Stryker of the Yard (also known as Stryker of Scotland Yard and Scotland Yard Cases ) is a 1953 British crime film directed by Arthur Crabtree and starring Clifford Evans, Susan Stephen, Jack Watling and Eliot Makeham.

A second cinema film, Companions in Crime followed in 1954.

In 1957, these films and others aired as a 15-episode British television series of the same name, starring Evans, George Woodbridge, and Tim Turner. The series was also shown on U.S. TV.

A host (Tom Fallon) introduced each episode, and at the end of each story intoned: "And it just goes to show that crime does not pay."

In 1957–1958, the American Broadcasting Company aired the series Scotland Yard, originally made as a series of British theatrical film shorts, hosted by Edgar Lustgarten and starring Russell Napier.

Cast
 Clifford Evans – Inspector Stryker
 Susan Stephen  – Peggy Sinclair
 Jack Watling   – Tony Ashworth
 Eliot Makeham  – Uncle Henry Petheridge
 George Woodbridge  – Sergeant Hawker

Missing episodes

References

External links
 (Film)
 (TV series)

1953 films
1953 crime films
British crime films
Films directed by Arthur Crabtree
British black-and-white films
1950s English-language films
1950s British films